This is a partial list of characters in Jungle Jam and Friends: The Radio Show!.

The Jungle Jam Gang

Regular characters

Narrator
The narrator (Nathan Carlson), often referred to as "Mr. Narrator" by the characters, is an interactive force in the jungle; there is some indication that he is a jungle explorer.

Gruffy
Gruffy Bear (Nathan Carlson), the de facto main character of the series, is a jovial and level-minded construction worker brown bear. He is the only primary character with a wife (Muffy), a child (Gruffy Jr), and a dog (Wuffy).

Sully
Sully the Aardvark (Nathan Carlson) is a simple-minded aardvark. Frequently noted as an excellent cannonball diver, he is the best friend of Millard J. Monkey. At one point he played the triangle in the Jungle Band.

Millard
Millard Jackanapes Monkey (Phil Lollar), usually referred to as Millard J. Monkey or Millard the Monkey, is a clumsy and foolhardy monkey. He is the best friend of Sully the Aardvark. Millard was a later addition to the cast of characters, but quickly became a central character and fan favorite.

Nozzles
Nozzles the Elephant (Nathan Carlson) is a brooding and usually wise African elephant. However, he is prone to giving in to the other animals' inanity. He is a lover of mystery novels and gadgets.

Racquet
Racquet the Skunk (Nathan Carlson) is an ambitious but kind-hearted skunk. He is frequently shown to be an excellent badminton player.

Jean-Claude
Jean-Claude the Flying Squirrel (Phil Lollar) is a somewhat self-centered French flying squirrel. Ironically, he pilots a biplane.

The Cheetah Sisters
Cheetah Bonita (Shelby Daniels), Cheetah Anita (Shelby Daniels), and Cheetah Sally (Julie Miller) are members of the musical group The Cheetah Sisters.

Sloth
The Sloth (Cindy Parker), also referred to as Sloth, is an easy-going sloth.

Weatherbee
Weatherbee the Owl (Phil Lollar) is a sensible owl who often acts as the leader or (judge) of the jungle.

Max
Max the Giraffe (Nathan Carlson) is a hair-brained giraffe.

Other recurring characters

Muffy
Muffy Bear (Nathan Carlson) is the supportive wife of Gruffy Bear.

Gruffy, Jr.
Gruffy Bear Jr. (Adam Burton), is the only child of Gruffy and Muffy Bear.

Bert-the-Moose
Bert-the-Moose (Nathan Carlson), is a moose who hosts a musical segment included in the "and friends" part of the show called "Sing Along With Bert-the-Moose." He always followed by his Bert-the-Moose singing waiters.

Reynold
Reynold the Warthog (Phil Lollar) is a dry-humored and mud-loving warthog.

Hermie
Hermie the Love Bug (Nathan Carlson) is a misguided green lacewing.

Coy Ote
Coy Ote is a friendly Irish Wolfhound.

Flip
Mentioned in the theme song, Flip (Buddy Miller) the owl appeared on the albums and used mostly for songs. He never made it into the regular episodes, and was replaced by Weatherbee in the series.

RazzleFlabben Island

Narrator

The narrator (Nathan Carlson) is the same as that of the Jungle Jam Gang.

Regular characters

Marvy Snuffleson
Marvin Carvey "Marvy" Snuffleson III (Adam Burton) is a elementary school student who gets carried away in a flash-flood to RazzleFlabben Island.

Carl and Olaf
Olaf (Nathan Carlson) and Carl (Phil Lollar), adult RazzleFlabbenz who are married, are Marvy's two closest friends on RazzleFlabben Island.They are married.

Katie Snuffleson
Katie Snuffleson (Katie Herndon) is Marvy's little sister. She, too, has fallen victim to the mysterious flash-floods.

Mr. Snuffleson
Marvin Carvey Snuffleson II (David Buller), usually referred to as Mr. Snuffleson, is Marvy's caring father. As a child, he too was taken to RazzleFlabben Island.

Mrs. Snuffleson
Mrs. Snuffleson (Michelle Richards) is Marvy's mother.

Lars
Lars (Nathan Carlson) is often a level voice among the RazzleFlabbenz.

Bert
Bert (Phil Lollar) is a RazzleFlabben often found in places of authority (e.g., a judge, a conductor, etc.).

Other recurring characters

Ingmar Flabben
Ingmar RazzleFlabben (Phil Lollar), né Flabben, was the leader of the Flabbenz until he made his love for Ingrid public and joined the two peoples together.

Ingrid Razzle
Ingrid RazzleFlabben (Maureen Davis), née Razzle, was the leader of the Razzles until her marriage to Ingmar.

Sven Ingersoll
Sven Ingersoll is a magical, shape-shifting RazzleFlabben and is also the first RazzleFlabben Marvy meets.

Merl
Merl is the second RazzleFlabben to meet Marvy.

Bjørn
Bjørn (Nathan Carlson), also referred to as the Disobedient SmivenBiven, is a SmivenBiven held prisoner on RazzleFlabben Island.

Species

RazzleFlabbenz 
Originally two peoples, the Razzles and the Flabbenz, they united after Mr. Snuffleson helped work out their centuries-old dispute. Though humanoid, they are exceptionally tall and covered in brightly colored fur. They highly prize eggplant parmigiana.

SmivenBivenz
The SmivenBivenz are a race of large, hairy, bad-tempered humanoid monsters with tails who live on the neighboring SmivenBiven Island.

Bjørn (see above)
Snork (Nathan Carlson) steals the valuable portraits of Ingmar and Ingrid RazzleFlabben and frames Marvy.
a group of man-eating SmivenBivenz capture Katie.

Other species
 The side-winding furbellies are a race of malevolent cowboy creatures with furry bellies. Three, Larango (Phil Lollar), Durango (Nathan Carlson), and Hives (Nathan Carlson), attempt to overthrow RazzleFlabben Island and enslave the RazzleFlabbenz.
The whistling furchettas are a race of small, simple-minded, good-natured, and sweet creatures who live homy lives on RazzleFlabben Island.
The Rockport falcon is a giant, man- and furchetta-eating falcon.

References 

Jungle Jam and Friends: The Radio Show!
Jungle Jam and Friends